Faversham is a town in Kent, England, in the district of Swale, roughly halfway between Sittingbourne and Canterbury.

Faversham may also refer to:

 Faversham (UK Parliament constituency), a parliamentary constituency in Kent
 Faversham railway station, a railway station on the Chatham Main Line
 HMS Faversham (1918), a Hunt-class minesweeper
 William Faversham (1868-1940), English film actor

See also
 Faversham Abbey
 Faversham Parish Church
 Feversham (disambiguation)
 Faversham explosives industry
 The Penny Dreadfuls Present...The Brothers Faversham